Rex Williams is an English professional snooker and billiards player.

Rex Williams may also refer to:
 Rex Williams (politician) (1928–2012), Australian politician
 Rex Williams (commissioner), New Zealand chancellor of Canterbury University and commissioner at the Canterbury Regional Council

See also
 Reg Williams (disambiguation)